Johnny Brookes (born 18 October 1943) is a former English  footballer who played as a forward.

He began his professional football career with Sheffield Wednesday.

He was signed for Sligo Rovers by manager Shay Keogh in late 1966 and went on to enjoy a successful career in Ireland with Rovers.

References

1943 births
Living people
English footballers
Association football forwards
Sligo Rovers F.C. players
English Football League players